Worth Township is one of 29 townships in Cook County, Illinois. As of the 2010 census, its population was 152,633, with its most populous municipalities including Oak Lawn (pop. 56,690), Evergreen Park (19,852), Alsip (pop. 19,277), and Chicago Ridge (pop. 14,305). It was founded in 1849, when the county voted to subdivide itself into townships.

The township hall is located at 11601 S. Pulaski Road in Alsip. Other township municipalities include Hometown and Merrionette Park, as well as portions of Blue Island, Crestwood, Worth, Palos Heights, Robbins and Bridgeview. Worth Township's approximate borders are Harlem Avenue (Illinois Route 43) on the west, 87th Street on the north, Western Avenue on the east and 135th Street on the south. The township, however, does not include the parts of the city of Chicago (namely, zip code 60655, which is mostly the Mount Greenwood neighborhood) that lie within these boundaries. Near its southern boundary, the township is crossed by the Cal-Sag Channel.

Geography

The population is 79.6% White (71.3% White Non-Hispanic), 9.9% Black, 0.3% American Indian or Alaska Native, 1.7% Asian, 0.05% Native Hawaiian or Pacific Islander, 6.2% some other race, and 2.2% two or more races. Hispanic or Latino people of any race made up 15.7% of the population.

Borders
Worth Township is bordered on the north by Stickney Township and the Chicago community of Ashburn, on the west by Palos Township, on the south by Bremen Township, and on the east by Calumet Township and the Chicago communities of Beverly, Mount Greenwood and Morgan Park.

Cities, towns, villages
 Alsip
 Blue Island (approximately 40% of the city, northwest of 135th Street and Western Avenue)
 Bridgeview (approximately one-half square mile, east of Harlem Avenue)
 Chicago (Beverly Country Club, Mount Greenwood and Mount Hope Cemeteries)
 Chicago Ridge
 Crestwood (nearly half the village, north of 135th Street)
 Evergreen Park
 Hometown
 Merrionette Park
 Oak Lawn
 Palos Heights (half the city, east of Harlem)
 Robbins (one quarter of the village, north of 135th Street)
 Worth (two thirds of the village, east of Harlem)

The south edge of the city of Chicago is within this township geographically but is a separate entity, with exception of two cemeteries and a golf course.

Unincorporated Towns
 Hazel Green at

Adjacent townships
 Stickney Township (north)
 Calumet Township (east)
 Thornton Township (southeast)
 Bremen Township (south)
 Orland Township (southwest)
 Palos Township (west)
 Lyons Township (northwest)

Cemeteries
The township contains these fifteen cemeteries: Beverly Memorial Park, Burr Oak Cemetery, Chapel Hills Gardens South, Ever Rest (historical), Evergreen, First Evangelical Lutheran, Hazel Green, Holy Sepulchre Cemetery, Lincoln Cemetery, Mount Greenwood, Mount Hope, Oak Hill, Restvale Cemetery, Saint Benedict Catholic and Saint Mary's.

Major highways
  Interstate 294
  U.S. Route 12
  U.S. Route 20
  Illinois Route 43
  Illinois Route 50
  Illinois Route 83

Airports and landing strips
 Alsip Fire Department Heliport
 Christ Hospital Heliport

Landmarks
 Burr Oak Woods (Cook County Forest Preserves) (east half)
 Elizabeth A Conkey Forest (Cook County Forest Preserves)
 Joshua P. Young House

Demographics

Governance
Worth Township is governed by 8 elected officials, chosen every four years. The current administration is:

Supervisor Patricia Joan Murphy
Clerk Eamon McMahon
Assessor Shaun Murphy
Trustee Richard Lewandowski
Trustee Kelly Sexton-Kelly
Trustee Jerry Hurckes
Trustee Mychal Toscas
Highway Commissioner Vicky Moody

Education
Worth Township is served by three public high school districts: Community High School District 218 (Dwight D. Eisenhower High School, Harold L. Richards High School and Alan B. Shepard High School), Oak Lawn Community High School District 229 and Evergreen Park Community High School District 231.

 Chicago Public Schools (some students)

Trinity Christian College is located in Worth Township, in Palos Heights.

Political districts
 Illinois's 1st congressional district
 Illinois's 3rd congressional district
 State House District 27
 State House District 28
 State House District 31
 State House District 35
 State House District 36
 State Senate District 14
 State Senate District 16
 State Senate District 18

Record pension
In 2002, Lawrence Hupe, the Worth Township school treasurer, retired with one of the largest government pensions in Illinois after receiving annual bonuses exceeding 25% of his salary in the last five years of his 25-year service. At $153,835, Hupe's pension exceeded the state governor's salary. His employer, the Worth Township Board of School Trustees, reported to the Illinois Municipal Retirement Fund that Hupe took home an extra $302,000 above his salary between 1998 and 2002. Hupe claimed that the additional payments were in lieu of unused annual leave. Hupe's successor was paid a salary of $87,500, just 57% of Hupe's pension.

References
 
 United States Census Bureau 2007 TIGER/Line Shapefiles
 United States National Atlas

External links
 Worth Township official website
 City-Data.com
 Illinois State Archives
 Township Officials of Illinois
 Cook County official site

Townships in Cook County, Illinois
Townships in Illinois
1849 establishments in Illinois